The original Overseas National Airways Inc (ONA) was an American airline, formed in June 1950 as a supplemental air carrier. It ceased operations on September 14, 1978. The airline started as Air Travel in 1946 and was renamed Calasia Air Transport the same year. The name changed to Overseas National in 1950 when it became a supplemental air carrier.

The company's headquarters were on the property of John F. Kennedy International Airport in New York City.

A second related company, which took the name in 1978, was later renamed National Airlines before declaring bankruptcy in 1986.

History

First ONA 
 

ONA  was founded in June 1950 as a charter airline that carried both freight and passengers. It was based at Idlewild Airport (now New York JFK Airport) with five Douglas DC-6 aircraft in the fleet. Its main function was to carry US military personnel to and from Europe from the east coast of the US. ONA also had a dedicated Douglas DC-7F for freight operations.

For a brief period from 1964 to 1965, ONA went into Chapter 11 bankruptcy to reorganize. Flights resumed in October 1965, this time operating Douglas DC-8 aircraft.  Operations expanded to include flights to the Caribbean, Europe and India.

Beginning in 1968, ONA acquired 11 secondhand Lockheed L-188 Electra turboprops, which were used for freight operations.  The DC-8s serviced trans-Atlantic routes.  The airline then acquired McDonnell Douglas DC-9-30 jetliners, which replaced the Electras. In 1973 two McDonnell Douglas DC-10 widebody jetliners were acquired.

In 1978 when airline deregulation went into effect, the board of directors decided to liquidate the airline. Due to the value of the company's DC-10s, this was successful. ONA ceased operations in October 1978.

Second ONA 
The second airline to be named Overseas National Airways was created when officials of Overseas National Airways formed a FAR Part 129 leasing company known as United Air Carriers on July 21, 1977. When Overseas National Airways folded in 1978, the company was renamed Overseas National Airways and it was certified in 1980 under FAR 121 as a cargo and passenger charter company.

In 1982 the company gained approval for scheduled service, leading to the company purchasing the name National Airlines from Pan American World Airways in anticipation of scheduled New York to Paris service. The scheduled service never materialized, although charter flights were flown on the route.

Due to financial problems the airline ceased operations in December 1985, filing for bankruptcy in May 1986.

Incidents 
 On 2 May 1970, ALM Flight 980 was being operated by ONA with a DC-9-30 named "Caribbean Queen", from John F. Kennedy International Airport in New York to St. Maarten in the Caribbean. Several failed attempts to land in bad weather at St. Maarten, followed by a decision to divert to St. Croix, forced the flight crew to ditch the aircraft after running out of fuel. 23 of the 63 people on board were killed. The "Caribbean Queen" is still at the bottom of the sea.
 On 12 November 1975, ONA Flight 032, a DC-10 on a ferry flight to Frankfurt Airport, suffered a bird strike while on its takeoff roll at John F. Kennedy International Airport in New York. The aircraft was destroyed, but all 139 people on board survived.
 On 2 January 1976, Saudia Flight 5130, an ONA leased DC-10 experienced an undershoot of the short runway at Istanbul.  A fire occurred in the #1 engine after the aircraft touched down and crash-landed. The aircraft was destroyed while all passengers survived.

Fleet 
Douglas DC-6
Douglas DC-7F (freighter version)
Douglas DC-8 (see fleet breakdown in next section)
Lockheed L-188 Electra
McDonnell Douglas DC-9-30 (series 32CF and 33CF models.  CF stands for convertible passenger/freighter.)
McDonnell Douglas DC-10

Douglas DC-8 fleet 
2 - Douglas DC-8-21
2 - Douglas DC-8-31
4 - Douglas DC-8-33
1 - Douglas DC-8-33F (freighter version)
1 - Douglas DC-8-52
5 - Douglas DC-8-55
1 - Douglas DC-8-55F
7 - Douglas DC-8-61 (stretched "Super DC-8")
2 - Douglas DC-8-61CF (stretched "Super DC-8". CF stands for convertible passenger/freighter.)
10 - Douglas DC-8-63CF (stretched "Super DC-8" convertible passenger/freighter)

See also 
 List of defunct airlines of the United States

References

External links

ONA uniforms
Code information 
ONA crew website

Defunct airlines of the United States
Airlines established in 1950
Airlines disestablished in 1978
1950 establishments in New York City
1978 disestablishments in New York (state)
American companies established in 1950
American companies disestablished in 1978